Les Baxter's Balladeers were a 1960s folk group formed by band leader Les Baxter. They released an album and a few singles during the early 1960s. Some of the musicians to pass through the group were David Crosby, Bob Ingram and Phil Campos.

Background
Les Baxter's Balladeers has the distinction of being the very first act to appear at The Golden Bear in Orange County, California.
The group was made up of young folk singers. The role of the group was originally intended to make Baxter's act more "in the now". They would perform in the middle of Baxter's band's set. 

In 1961, their self titled album Les Baxter's Balladeers was released on the Reprise label. The group at that time on the recording were Joyce James, Terrea Lea, Phil Campos, Ernie Sheldon, Paul Potash, Jerry Yester, Michael Kollander and Paul Hansen. The instrumentalists backing them were Allan Reuss on guitar, Mike Storm on 12-string guitar, Jerry Yester on banjo,  Tony Reyes on bass and Chico Guerrero on drums.

Around 1962, Bobby Ingram and David Crosby joined the group. Crosby’s brother Ethan was also a member. They then did a national folk circuit tour. As of September 1963, the group consisted of Bob Ingram, David Crosby,  Mike Clough and Ethan Chip Crosby. Later that month along with the Count Basie Sextet, Lisa Kirk, Allan Sherman and Vic Damone, they appeared on The Lively Ones, shown on NBC TV. After being the group for a bit and feeling it was a bit too conservative for him, Crosby left and did the rounds on the LA folk circuit.

In April 1963, the lineup included Peggy Taylor, Phil Campos, Jerry Yester, Paul Hansen and Ted Botkin. They were appearing at venues like the Carson Nugget. 

During their time they released an album and appeared on at least 3 singles.

Discography

Singles

References

American folk musical groups
Reprise Records artists